Vinogradi is a village in the municipality of Sandanski, in Blagoevgrad Province, Bulgaria.

Vinogradi Peak on Graham Land in Antarctica is named after the village.

References

Villages in Blagoevgrad Province